A list of the tallest structures (over ) in Estonia. This list contains all types of structures.

See also
 List of tallest buildings in Estonia
 List of tallest structures in the former Soviet Union
 List of tallest chimneys in the world

References

Tallest structures
Estonia